= Bohar railway station =

Railway station in Pakistan

General information
- Coordinates: 29.844°N 67.3606°E
- Owner: Ministry of Railways

Other information
- Station code: BOU

History
- Former names: Great Indian Peninsula Railway
Location

Bohar railway station (Urdu: بوہر ریلوے اسٹیشن) is located in Pakistan.

== See also ==
- List of railway stations in Pakistan
- Pakistan Railways
